Rainbow Quest (1965–66) was a U.S. television series devoted to folk music and hosted by Pete Seeger.  It was videotaped in black-and-white and featured musicians playing in traditional American music genres such as traditional folk music, old-time music, bluegrass and blues. The show's title is drawn from the lyrics of the song by Seeger "Oh, Had I A Golden Thread".

Production
The program was produced on a low budget funded by Seeger and his co-producer, Sholom Rubinstein. Seeger's wife, Toshi Seeger, given the title "Chief Cook and Bottle Washer" in the closing credits after each show, actually functioned as the director by dint of the fact that she continually made suggestions to Rubinstein that he passed along to the camera operators. Eventually the cameramen simply followed her instructions without waiting for Rubinstein to repeat them.  

The shows were unrehearsed and there was no studio audience even though Seeger's metier was leading his audiences in song.  Songs were traded between Seeger and his guests and Seeger often joined in while his guests performed.  One show was dedicated to Woody Guthrie and another to Lead Belly.  Lead Belly had died long before and Guthrie was incapacitated with Huntington's disease.  Both shows featured film clips of the legendary singer/songwriters who had been close friends of Seeger's.  Many of the other shows featured film clips made by the Seegers during their travels in the U.S. and elsewhere, including a demonstration in Mexico of guitar-making and another in the West Indies of making a steel drum.

Altogether 39 shows, each 52 minutes long, were recorded in 1965–66 at WNJU-TV (Channel 47), a New York City-based UHF station with studios in Newark, New Jersey. The shows were broadcast by Channel 47, primarily a Spanish-language outlet, to a very limited audience because only televisions equipped with a UHF antenna and tuner could receive them, and reception was difficult in an age prior to cable. For a few years in 1967–68, the shows were repeated on public television station WNDT (Channel 13, now WNET). 

Among the guests featured on the program's 39 episodes were Johnny Cash, June Carter, Reverend Gary Davis, Mississippi John Hurt, Doc Watson, The Stanley Brothers,  Elizabeth Cotten, Patrick Sky, Buffy Sainte-Marie, Judy Collins, Donovan, Richard Fariña and Mimi Fariña, Sonny Terry and Brownie McGhee, Mamou Cajun Band, Bernice Johnson Reagon, The Beers Family, Roscoe Holcomb, Sonia Malkine, Cousin Emmy and Shawn Phillips. The Clancy Brothers and Tommy Makem and Tom Paxton appeared on the first show of the series on short notice because Seeger felt ill, as he explained on camera. Only Paddy and Liam appeared of the Clancy Brothers. No explanation was given for Tom Clancy's absence from the group. A clip of Tommy Makem singing "The Butcher Boy" during this initial episode appeared in Martin Scorsese's Grammy-winning documentary about Bob Dylan and the early influences on him, No Direction Home.

Publication
In 1980, Norman Ross, president of Clearwater Publishing in New York, a firm that was primarily a publisher of microfilms and reference books, proposed to publish the series on videocassette.  (At that time VHS and Betamax were relatively new inventions.)  Ross's company, whose name was eponymous with the nonprofit organization founded by Seeger and the boat at the center of the organization's efforts to clean the Hudson River, was not affiliated with the organization.  (Ross had named his publishing company Clearwater in honor of Seeger.)  However, when Ross began having the 2" broadcast masters copied onto 3/4" cassettes to be used as dubmasters, it became clear that the studio tapes had badly deteriorated while in the vault.  A local video studio, Devlin, reported that the surface of the tapes was flaking off, which had damaged their equipment and resulted in copies that were of very poor quality.  Devlin resigned from the job.

Another studio in New York examined one of the tapes and reported that it could be rescued by passing it through a chemical bath several times and then transferring the image to new media. However, they estimated that the 2" tapes would only survive one such pass, and the cost would be $19,500 for the 39 shows, a sum that was far too costly for either Ross or the original producers to justify at that point. On the other hand, the loss of all 39 shows would have been a great tragedy, given the unique qualities of the series.

At the suggestion of Manny Kirchheimer, an independent film maker whose wife Gloria was an editor at Clearwater Publishing, the decision was made to seek a grant for the work and a proposal was prepared under the aegis of The Woody Guthrie Foundation, whose director, Harold Leventhal, was also Pete Seeger's manager.  The proposal was submitted to the National Endowment for the Arts, where Bess Lomax Hawes (sister of the folklorist Alan Lomax), who had sung with Seeger and Woody Guthrie, among others, as a member of the Almanac Singers, was one of the key people involved in making the decision.  Thus the grant was awarded, the tapes were processed and two new sets were created:  1" tapes that went back into the vault and 3/4" videocassettes that became the dubmasters for Clearwater Publishing, which then proceeded to offer copies of the series for sale.

Because Clearwater's marketing efforts were primarily directed to libraries, sales were sparse through the '80s and '90s, especially prior to the advent of the Internet, and only a few thousand cassettes were sold in total.  However, a number of libraries acquired the complete (38 shows) collection, including University of Wisconsin-Madison, University of Pennsylvania, Ohio State University, National University (available only to National University faculty in San Diego), and the Tokyo Folklore Center.  During this period Sun Video, owned by Caspar Weinberger, Jr., offered a small selection of the shows to the general public.  In 2003 Ross, having sold both Clearwater Publishing and his subsequent firm, Norman Ross Publishing, withdrew from the agreement. A subsequent agreement with Shanachie, negotiated by Rubinstein, resulted in 12 of the shows becoming available on DVD, however the remaining 27 were no longer available for sale.  Two episodes, one featuring Tommy Makem and another featuring Johnny Cash and June Carter were available on Netflix' streaming service as of December 2011. Sholom Rubinstein died a few years later.

In September 2015 archivist and librarian Karl-Rainer Blumenthal announced that he had uploaded copies of 10 available episodes to the Internet Archive. His blog post, with streaming players for the videos, originally included a footnote stating that "The show has been in the public domain since the 1990s"; he has since edited his comment, noting that he "cannot confidently characterize the copyright status of this work".

Meanwhile, a number of YouTube subscribers have uploaded full episodes or individual performances from the series to that video hosting site, where they can be found with a simple search on the program title (with Seeger's name, to eliminate a racehorse called "Rainbow Quest"), or by searching for individual rarely-seen artists, such as Richard Farina.

Episode list

 The Clancy Brothers and Tommy Makem with Tom Paxton
 "Lead Belly" (solo performance by Seeger)
 Elizabeth Cotten with Rosa Valentin & Rafael Martinez
 Ruth Rubin
 Jean Ritchie and Bernice Reagon
 Malvina Reynolds and Jack Elliott
 Bessie Jones and Children from the Downtown Community School
 New Lost City Ramblers
 The Beers Family
 Herbert Manana
 Martha Schlamme & Abraham Stockman
 Doc Watson with Clint Howard and Fred Price
 Norman Studer and Grant Rogers
 "Political Satire" (solo performance by Seeger)
 Lino Manocchia, Ralph Marino, and Federico Picciano
 Mimi and Richard Fariña 
 Roscoe Holcomb with Jean Redpath
 The Stanley Brothers and the Clinch Mountain Boys with Cousin Emmy
 Sonia Malkine
 "Woody Guthrie" (solo performance by Seeger)
 Patrick Sky and The Pennywhistlers
 Len Chandler
 Donovan, Shawn Phillips, and Reverend Gary Davis
 
 Mamou Cajun Band
 Frank Warner and film of Frank Proffit
 Paul Draper & Coleridge Perkinson
 Penny Cohen and Sonya Cohen
 Theodore Bikel and Rashid Hussein
 Steve Addiss and Bill Crofut with Pham Duy
 The Greenbriar Boys
 Judy Collins
 Jim Garland and Hazel Garland
 Sonny Terry and Brownie McGhee
 Bessie Jones and Children from the Downtown Community School
 Mississippi John Hurt, Hedy West & Paul Cadwell
 Herbert Levy, K. L. Wong and Hi-Landers Steel Band
 Buffy Sainte-Marie
 Johnny Cash and June Carter

VHS/DVD releases
Starting in the early 1980s 38 of the shows were made available on VHS, Betamax and 3/4" (U-Matic) tapes by Norman Ross through the companies he owned, Clearwater Publishing, Norman Ross Publishing and Ross Publishing. The 39th show, featuring Johnny Cash and June Carter, was withheld at the request of Pete Seeger because Johnny Cash was heavily on drugs during his appearance. However, in the late '90s this show was released to the public by Sholom Rubinstein. In 2005, 12 episodes were released on six DVDs by Shanachie, two episodes per disc.

Johnny Cash and June Carter / Roscoe Holcomb with Jean Redpath
The Clancy Brothers and Tommy Makem / The Mamou String Band
The Stanley Brothers with Cousin Emmy / Doc Watson with Clint Howard and Fred Price
The New Lost City Ramblers / The Greenbriar Boys
Judy Collins / Elizabeth Cotten
Sonny Terry and Brownie McGhee / Mississippi John Hurt

See also
 "Where Have All the Flowers Gone?"

References

External links
 Mother Jones: The Riff Blog: 
 PopMatters: Pete Seeger's Rainbow Quest, The Anti-TV TV

1960s American music television series
1965 American television series debuts
1966 American television series endings
Pete Seeger